Sea-Doo Hydrocross is a driving game developed by Vicarious Visions and published by Vatical Entertainment. It was released on June 6, 2001 on the PlayStation after many delays, though the planned Nintendo 64, Dreamcast and Game Boy Color releases never came to fruition. Project lead was Bill Armintrout and game designer was Mitch Booker.

Development
At E3 2000, Vicarious Visions showed off two of their upcoming games: Polaris SnoCross and Sea-Doo Hydrocross. The former was said to be 80% complete at the time, with Sea-Doo HydroCross also nearing completion. Both were meant to be published by Vatical Entertainment later that year. The August 2000 issue of Nintendo Power (#135) said that both Cross games would see release in Fall 2000, which was later confirmed as that September. The September issue of Nintendo Power (#136) revealed that both games had been delayed, and said Sea-Doo Hydrocross would hit store shelves on November 21, a deadline that was missed as well. In February 2001 that IGN had another interview with Vatical and confirmed that Sea-Doo Hydrocross was being tested by Nintendo, and had been delayed till Spring, a deadline that was also missed. Micro64 argues "This was the last time we'd hear about it. This game never saw the light of day".

Micro64 explained:

Gameplay
The game has five unique jet ski models, eight courses, a detailed Simulation mode, a fast-and-furious arcade mode, and is based on the engine used in the video game Polaris SnoCross. It can be played with 1–2 players.

Although the skis look different, The only playable Sea-Doo PWC was the XP.

Critical reception
The PlayStation Museum gave the game a rating of 3.5 stars. A preview of the game by Nintendo Power in September 2000 noted "the development team still has a lot of work to do if Sea-Doo is to compare favourably with Wave Race 64". Nintendo Power reviewed the game in its 139th issue, giving it an overall score of 5.6. It criticized the angular waves, lazily illustrated effects and glitchy backgrounds. It noted that "the handling is very tight", but that the game's "arcade aspirations are bogged down by tame courses and even tamer CPU rivals".

References

External links

2001 video games
Cancelled Dreamcast games
Cancelled Game Boy Color games
Cancelled Nintendo 64 games
Engine Software games
Multiplayer and single-player video games
Personal watercraft racing video games
North America-exclusive video games
PlayStation (console) games
PlayStation (console)-only games
Vatical Entertainment games
Vicarious Visions games
Video games developed in the United States